The diocesan system of Christian church government in Uruguay comprises one ecclesiastical province headed by an archbishop. The province is in turn subdivided into 8 dioceses and 1 archdiocese each headed by a bishop or an archbishop.

The province had had 9 suffragan dioceses, but on 2 March 2020, the Diocese of Minas was suppressed by combining it with the Diocese of Maldonado-Punta del Este to form the Diocese of Maldonado-Punta del Este-Minas.

List of Dioceses

Ecclesiastical province of Montevideo

See also
Episcopal Conference of Uruguay
List of Roman Catholic cathedrals in Uruguay
Roman Catholic Church in Uruguay

External links 

GCatholic.org.

Uruguay
Roman Catholic Dioceses